Lindisfarne is a census-designated place (CDP) in Lake County, Montana, United States. The population was 284 at the 2010 census.

The community is in north-central Lake County, on the south shore of the Big Arm of Flathead Lake. It is bordered to the west by the community of Big Arm, and it extends to the east past White Swan Bay, White Swan Point, and Indian Bay to the west side of Matterhorn Point.

Demographics

References

Census-designated places in Lake County, Montana
Census-designated places in Montana